Bothrops affinis may refer to:

 Bothrops atrox, also known as the common lancehead, a venomous pitviper found in South America
 Atropoides nummifer occiduus, also known as the Guatemalan jumping pitviper, a venomous pitviper found in southern Mexico, Guatemala and El Salvador